The Wolkberg Wilderness Area is a protected area in Limpopo Province, South Africa.

The office, parking and camping site are located at the Klipdraai forest station. The park is traversed by the Mohlapitse River, a tributary of the Olifants River.

Many birds have found a home in this protected area, among others there are rare bat hawks, as well as black eagles, crowned eagles, hamerkops, pearl-breasted swallows and more.

See also
Wolkberg
 Protected areas of South Africa

References

External links
 Limpopo Tourism and Parks Board page on Wolkberg
 Footprint hiking club report on Wolkberg Wilderness Area

Limpopo Provincial Parks